Supriya is a feminine given name.

People 
Notable people with this name include the following

Supriya Aiman (born 1991) Indian actress
Supriya Chaudhuri, Indian scholar 
Supriya Devi (Supriya Choudhury; 1933 – 2018), Indian actress
Supriya Jatav (born 1991), Indian karateka
 Supriya Karnik (fl. 1994 – present) Indian actress
Supriya Lohith, Indian singer
Supriya Maskey (born 2000), Nepalese beauty queen
Supriya Gupta Mohile, American geriatric oncologist 
Supriya Mondal (born 1997), Indian swimmer
Supriya Pathak (born 1961), Indian actress
Supriya Pathare (born 1972), Indian actress
Supriya Pilgaonkar, known by her screen name Supriya (born 1967), Indian actress
Supriya Routray (born 1990), Indian footballer
Supriya Sahu (born 1968), Indian bureaucrat
Supriya Shukla (born Supriya Raina), Indian actress
Supriya Sule (born 1969), Indian politician

Fictional
 Supriya, a character depicted as the second wife of Karna in some novels.

See also